Niutian Town is an urban town in Taojiang County, Hunan Province, People's Republic of China.

Administrative division
The town is divided into 15 villages and 1 community, the following areas: Shuangjiangkou Community, Jinguangshan Village, Shashulun Village, Taoren Village, Linshijie Village, Niutian Village, Xiaowu Village, Qingtang Village, Zhushushan Village, Jinfengshan Village, Xiaojiachong Village, Anshan Village, Guanzhuang Village, Xiashankou Village, Santangwan Village, and Gusha Village (双江口社区、金光山村、杉树仑村、桃仁村、临市街村、牛田村、小坞村、清塘村、株树山村、金凤山村、肖家冲村、鞍山村、观庄村、峡山口村、三塘湾村、古杉村).

References

External links

Divisions of Taojiang County